The Roman Catholic Diocese of Warangal is a diocese located in the city of Warangal in the Ecclesiastical province of Hyderabad in India.

History
 22 December 1952: Established as Diocese of Warangal from the Diocese of Hyderabad

Leadership
 Bishops of Warangal (Latin Rite)
 Bishop Udumala Bala Showreddy (23 May 2013 – present)
 Bishop Thumma Bala (17 November 1986 – 12 March 2011)
 Bishop Alphonso Beretta, P.I.M.E. (8 January 1953 – 30 November 1985)

References

External links
 GCatholic.org 
 Catholic Hierarchy 

Roman Catholic dioceses in India
Christian organizations established in 1952
Roman Catholic dioceses and prelatures established in the 20th century
Christianity in Telangana
1952 establishments in India
Warangal